Break O'Day Council is a local government body in Tasmania, situated in the northern part of the state's east coast. Break O'Day is classified as a rural local government area and has a population of 6,770, the major towns of the region include St Helens, St Marys and Scamander.

History and attributes
The municipality was established on 2 April 1993. Originally proclaimed as Portland-Fingal, the name was later changed to Break O'Day.

Break O'Day is classified as rural, agricultural and large (RAL) under the Australian Classification of Local Governments.

Council

Current composition and election method
Break O'Day Council is composed of nine Councillors elected using the Hare-Clark system of proportional representation as a single ward. All Councillors are elected for a fixed four-year term of office. The Mayor and Deputy Mayor are each directly elected for a four-year term. The Mayor and Deputy Mayor must also be elected as Councillors in order to hold office. Elections are normally held in October, with the next election due to be held in October 2026. Neither the Labor Party nor the Liberal Party endorse local government candidates in Tasmania.

The most recent election of Councillors was held in October 2022, and the makeup of the Council is as follows:

The current Council, elected in 2022 is:

Suburbs

Not in above list
 Gladstone
 Tayene
 Upper Blessington

See also
List of local government areas of Tasmania

References

External links

Break O'Day Council official website
Local Government Association Tasmania
Tasmanian Electoral Commission - local government

 
Local government areas of Tasmania
East Coast Tasmania
North East Tasmania